"In the Stars" is the 22nd episode in the third season, the 63rd episode overall, of the American dramedy series Ugly Betty, which aired on May 14, 2009.

Plot

Betty and Marc, hoping for a promotion to editor, are stunned when Wilhelmina and Daniel tell them that Calvin Hartley has initiated a hiring freeze at MODE and that they will have to wait until someone leaves. Later at YETI, Jodie informs the students about their final project, in which whoever comes up with the best assignment will get a major job offer for the three participants. Jodie pairs Betty, Marc and Matt together, but Matt's slacking off could jeopardize everything they have worked for. This becomes very noticeable when Matt shows up late for the assignment, and a frustrated Marc complains to Betty about his behavior as if Matt does not care about the project.

The three come up with an intergalactic/music project that will take place at the Planetarium, but it appears that Matt is not at all interested, since he forgot to book the place days in advance. Later that evening, Marc surprises Betty and Matt with getting singer Adele for the project. Unfortunately, Matt's lack of involvement continues to irk Marc, forcing him to get Betty to drop him as their partner. When Matt hears this, he leaves the apartment. When Betty follows him, he tells her that he wants to try pursuing a new passion as an artist.

The following day, Betty finally gets the Planetarium for the assignment. But when she gets there, she sees Victoria, who asks Betty for a favor. She reveals that Matt has tried various passions throughout his life but never fully committed to finishing a single one; she urges Betty to convince Matt to finish YETI or it could destroy both their futures as editors. Betty reluctantly goes along with it and later back at MODE she does convince Matt to finish the project. The shoot runs smoothly as planned until Victoria shows up, prompting Matt to argue with Betty, furious at her for listening to his mother. Overhearing the argument, Adele's manager convinces Adele to cancel on the shoot, angering Marc further due to Matt's unprofessionalism.

Daniel is surprised when Molly, after looking at the layout for the wedding issue, asks about whether Daniel will pop the question, and after talking to Claire, he proposes, making Molly very happy and excited. However, the wedding plans make Molly worried to the point that she calls it off after she is shown a picture of a nursery, distraught about her own bleak future.

After Daniel and Betty complain about their problems, Betty turns their setbacks into a combined plan, turning the photo shoot into a wedding for Daniel and Molly, who finally get married at the Planetarium. During the reception, Matt apologizes to Betty, vowing to find a passion he can devote himself to, and tells her that he loves her. He then introduces her to Adele, whom he managed to convince to come back for the project. The project pays off for Betty, Marc and Matt, who are anointed the YETI future editors by Jodie. Meanwhile, while packing for their honeymoon, Daniel discovers that Molly has collapsed on the bathroom floor.

Hilda stumbles onto a job offer for Elena at a hospital in Chula Vista, California. Hilda confronts Elena, who is unsure if she will accept because of her feelings for Ignacio. Hilda talks Ignacio about this situation, resulting in Ignacio proposing to Elena, and with the Suarez family blessing, Elena says yes. However, after Ignacio gets a phone call for the hospital in California, he encourages Elena to pursue the job in California by buying her a ticket, showing his commitment to what is good for her. The two have their final kiss before they part ways, promising to start a long-distance relationship with each other.

As Calvin sits in at the meeting for the wedding issue, he feels that the Cherry 7UP ad presentation is not good enough, so when he sees Claire walk in to prepare for her "Hot Flash" issue, Cal decides to make Claire part of the project. This prompts Claire and Wilhelmina to square off over their roles at Mode, with Wilhelmina criticizing Claire's lack of inspiration and Claire firing back over Wilhelmina's snarkiness, especially in front of a crying model, leading to the two to talk to Cal. Claire acknowledges that Wilhelmina is right, bowing out of the catfight for the good of the magazine. As Wilhelmina leaves, Cal asks to speak with Claire privately. Hours later at the reception, Claire reveals to a stunned Wilhelmina that Cal has made her the Senior VP at Meade Publications, which means that Wilhelmina will have to report to her arch-rival.

Production
This episode featured yet another promotional tie in, courtesy of Dr Pepper Snapple Group, as a poster for the new Cherry 7 Up Antioxidant soda was shown during the conference room scene in which Cal irked Wilhelmina by making creative suggestions.

Reception
While the episode was well received, especially with the cameo from Adele, Zap2it's Hanh Nguyen did note in his review that "I know shows need to be creative about advertisers, but the Cherry 7-up plug was pretty clunky."

See also
 Ugly Betty
 Ugly Betty (season 3)

Notes
Although credited, Ashley Jensen (Christina McKinney) does not appear in this episode.
Adele appeared in this episode and performed Right As Rain on her debut album 19.

Ratings
Despite placing third with a 2.0/6 among 18-49s, a 4.7/8 overall and 6.8 million in the United States (down 9 percent from the previous episode) tuning in, this installment helped ABC win the crucial Thursday night battle.

Also starring
Adele as herself
Daniel Eric Gold as Matt Hartley
Bernadette Peters as Jodie
Christine Baranski as Victoria Hartley
Sarah Lafleur as Molly
Alec Mapa as Suzuki St. Pierre
Lauren Velez as Elena

Guest Starring
Joanna P. Adler as Wedding planner

References

2009 American television episodes
Ugly Betty (season 3) episodes